Servicio Aéreo Ejecutivo  (SAE) was a small Air Taxi operator in Peru that later on expanded operations to include charter passenger and cargo flights.

Company history

SAE's began operations as a small Air Taxi/Charter operator using British Aerospace BAe 125 business jets.  In 1991 operations were expanded with the acquisition of a Boeing 707-320C for transporting passengers for El Al and LAP Paraguay.

With the B707-320C freight flights were begun twice a week between Lima and Iquitos carrying produce, meat, and wood.  This aircraft was also used for charter flights throughout South America, Central America and Mexico.  An interline agreement with Transbrasil allowed SAE to operate a route Manaus-Buenos Aires-Manaus.

In 1992 those operations were interrupted twice when the 707 was sent to Africa on a contract that lasts until 1995.  Operations were re-initiated from Lima but due to internal problems, the Peruvian government cancelled the operating permit for SAE and the airline ceased to exist.

Fleet

1 - British Aerospace BAe 125
1 - Boeing 707-320C

External links
Data

References

Defunct airlines of Peru
Airlines established in 1990
Airlines disestablished in 1995